The pronunciation of the phoneme  in the  English language has many variations in different dialects.

Variations 
Depending on dialect,  has at least the following allophones in varieties of English around the world:
"Standard" R: labialized postalveolar approximant  (a common realization of the  phoneme worldwide, Received Pronunciation and General American included)
"Velarized" R: velarized alveolar approximant  (occurs in conservative Irish English)
"Retroflex" R: labialized retroflex approximant  (occurs in West Country English, some American and Canadian English and Irish English, including Northern Irish English)
"Trilled" or "Rolled" R: alveolar trill  (occurs in some very conservative Scottish English, South African English,  some Welsh English, Indian English and Jersey English)
"Uvular" R or "Northumbrian burr": voiced uvular fricative  (occurs in very conservative varieties of Geordie and Northumbrian English, though largely now disappeared, as well as possibly some conservative South-West and East Irish English and some Aberdeen English)
"Labial" or "Rounded" R: labiodental approximant  (occurs in some South-East England and London English as a presumed idiosyncrasy, though this is disputed, as is its overlap with rhotacism; see § R-labialization below)

In most British dialects  is labialized  in many positions, as in reed  and tree ; in the latter case, the  may be slightly labialized as well. 

In many dialects,  in the cluster , as in dream, is realized as a postalveolar fricative  or less commonly alveolar . In , as in tree, it is a voiceless postalveolar fricative  or less commonly alveolar . In England, while the approximant has become the most common realization,  may still be pronounced as a voiceless tap  after  (as in thread). Tap realization of  after  is also reported in some parts of the United States, particularly Utah.

There are two primary articulations of the approximant : apical (with the tip of the tongue approaching the alveolar ridge or even curled back slightly) and domal (with a centralized bunching of the tongue known as  molar r  or sometimes  bunched r  or  braced r ). Peter Ladefoged wrote: "Many BBC English speakers have the tip of the tongue raised towards the roof of the mouth in the general location of the alveolar ridge, but many American English speakers simply bunch the body of the tongue up so that it is hard to say where the articulation is". However, this distinction has little or no perceptual consequence, and may vary idiosyncratically between individuals.

Rhoticity and non-rhoticity

English accents around the world are frequently characterized as either rhotic or non-rhotic. Most accents in England, Wales, Australia, New Zealand, and South Africa are non-rhotic accents, and in those English dialects, the historical English phoneme /r/ is pronounced except after a vowel.

On the other hand, the historical /r/ is pronounced in all contexts in rhotic accents, which are spoken in most of Scotland, Ireland, the United States, Canada, and in some English accents (like in the West Country and some parts of Lancashire and the far north). In rhotic accents, when  is not followed by a vowel phoneme, it generally surfaces as r-coloring of the preceding vowel or its coda: nurse , butter .

R-labialization 
R-labialization, which should not be confused with the rounding of initial  described above, is a process occurring in certain dialects of English, particularly some varieties of Cockney, in which the  phoneme is realized as a labiodental approximant , in contrast to an alveolar approximant .  

The use of labiodental  is commonly stigmatized by prescriptivists. However, its use is growing in many accents of British English. Most speakers who do so are from the South-East of England, particularly London.  

The  realization may not always be labiodental since bilabial realizations have also been reported.

R-labialization leads to pronunciations such as these:

 red – 
 ring – 
 rabbit – 
 Merry Christmas – 

See also 
English-language vowel changes before historic /r/
Rhoticity in English

References

English phonology
Rhotic consonants